The Old Fire Station is a Grade II listed former fire station in Renfrew Road, Kennington, London SE11.

It was built in 1868 for the Metropolitan Fire Brigade, by the architect Edward Cresy, and extended in 1896 for the London County Council, by the architect Robert Pearsall and his assistants.

References

External links

Grade II listed buildings in the London Borough of Lambeth
Kennington